Mattes is a surname. Notable people with the surname include:

Andy W. Mattes (born c. 1963), German businessman
Eva Mattes (born 1954), Austro-German actress
Eva and Franco Mattes (born 1976), Italian artists
John Mattes, American investigative journalist
John Mattes (politician) (fl. 1856–1918), American politician
Richard Mattes, American nutrition scientist
Ron Mattes (born 1968), American football player
R.J. Mattes (born 1990), American football player
Tracy Mattes (born 1969), American track and field athlete
Troy Mattes (born 1975), American baseball player

Surnames from given names